Sariz in Iran may refer to:
 Sariz, Kerman (ساريز - Sārīz)
 Sariz, Kurdistan (سريز - Sarīz)